Ragged Point Beach is an unincorporated community in Westmoreland County, in the U. S. state of Virginia.

References
GNIS entry

Unincorporated communities in Virginia
Unincorporated communities in Westmoreland County, Virginia